Villadonega Souza Rodrigues (born 7 June 1942), known as just Villadonega, is a Brazilian former footballer.

References

1942 births
Living people
Association football forwards
Brazilian footballers
Clube Atlético Mineiro players
Pan American Games medalists in football
Pan American Games silver medalists for Brazil
Footballers at the 1959 Pan American Games
Medalists at the 1959 Pan American Games